One for the Road is a 2003 British comedy-drama film written and directed by Chris Cooke. Filmed on location in and around Nottinghamshire, the film stars Hywel Bennett, Gregory Chisholm, Mark Devenport, and Rupert Procter as four men who meet at a compulsory rehabilitation class after being sentenced for drink driving.

The film was nominated for the Michael Powell Award for Best New British Feature Film at the 2003 Edinburgh International Film Festival and for the Golden Hitchcock Award at the 2003 Dinard Festival of British Film.

Cast
 Rupert Procter as Paul
 Gregory Chisholm (billed as Greg Chisholm) as Jimmy
 Mark Devenport as Mark
 Hywel Bennett as Richard Stevens
 Julie Legrand as Liz
 Micaiah Dring as Eve

References

External links

2003 films
British comedy-drama films
Film4 Productions films
2003 comedy-drama films
2000s English-language films
2000s British films